In the art of conjuring, lapping refers to a set of techniques whereby a performer seated at a table can secretly dispose of an item into their lap.  A common lapping technique is to sweep an item into the lap while pretending to pick it off the tabletop.

Conflicts
There are two issues with lapping: one must prepare the lap beforehand so that objects do not slip between the legs and retrieval of the lapped object(s).

Features
Subtle uses of lapping, such as secret switches or disposing of secret devices, enable effects that would not otherwise be possible.  Stand-up magicians, such as "table-hoppers" at restaurants, may need to use a Topit or other device to obtain a similar effect, due to their inability to lap. The magicians who utilize the trick of lapping are able to manipulate items on a surface to the edge. From there they can move the items so that it falls in their lap without the audience noticing.

Notable magicians
The magician Slydini was particularly noted for his lapping technique, which relied heavily on subtle misdirection.

References

Magic (illusion)